The Security Bureau is a body of the Government of Hong Kong responsible for policies of the maintenance of law and order, exercising immigration and customs control, rehabilitating offenders and drug abusers, and providing emergency fire and rescue services.

The bureau is headed by the Secretary for Security.

History 
In 1973 it was known as the Defence Branch. Before 1997, it was named the Security Branch.

In January 2021, a proposal from the government was announced, where information of airline passengers would be shared with the Immigration Department and passengers could potentially be banned from flying. In response to criticism that it could lead to preventing Hong Kong citizens from leaving the city, the Security Bureau claimed that they would not be affected, and that this would only be for "passenger information on flights heading to Hong Kong, rather than departing flights. The right of Hong Kong residents to enter or leave Hong Kong is not affected."

In February 2021, after reports that the Security Bureau worked with the Correctional Services Department to force prisoners with dual passports to declare a sole nationality, the Security Bureau cited mainland China's nationality laws to explain why consular visits to those prisoners with dual passports might be rejected. A spokesman for the British consulate said they were now "seeking answers from the Hong Kong authorities following the suggestion that they may withdraw our consular access to dual national prisoners and prevent us providing the support we have given since 1997."

In 2022, the Narcotics Division of the Security Bureau said it had plans to "table the relevant legislation" to outlaw CBD under the Dangerous Drugs Ordinance. The Narcotics Division said that even if THC levels were undetectable by lab tests, it would still "likely exist" and warrant a ban.

Subordinate entities 
The following public entities are controlled by the bureau:
Hong Kong Police Force
Hong Kong Fire Services Department
Correctional Services Department
Customs and Excise Department
Immigration Department
Government Flying Service
Civil Aid Service
Auxiliary Medical Services
Narcotics Division

See also  
 Hong Kong Disciplined Services
 Outbound Travel Alert System

References

External links
Official site

Hong Kong government policy bureaux
Law enforcement in Hong Kong